is an athletic stadium in Konosu, Saitama, Japan.

External links

Football venues in Japan
Sports venues in Saitama Prefecture
Kōnosu